Persatuan Sepakbola Kota Pahlawan (simply known as PS KoPa or PS Kota Pahlawan) is an Indonesian football club based in Surabaya, East Java. They currently compete in the Liga 3.

Founded in 2018 as PS Kota Pahlawan or PS KoPa, it is the reserve team of Persebaya Surabaya, and currently plays in Liga 3, holding its home matches at the Kodam V Brawijaya Stadium, Surabaya.

References

External links

Sport in Surabaya
Football clubs in Indonesia
Football clubs in East Java
Association football clubs established in 2018
2018 establishments in Indonesia